Daniel Vogt (born 19 March 1972) is a Liechtensteiner former alpine skier who competed in the 1992 Winter Olympics and 1994 Winter Olympics.

External links
 sports-reference.com

1972 births
Living people
Liechtenstein male alpine skiers
Olympic alpine skiers of Liechtenstein
Alpine skiers at the 1992 Winter Olympics
Alpine skiers at the 1994 Winter Olympics
Place of birth missing (living people)